FAQ (Frequently Asked Questions) - Satiericon is a musical composition by Juan María Solare, scored for piano four hands and written in Worpswede and Lilienthal (Germany) in April 2002. The piece is dedicated to Jorge Pítari. Total length: 13:00.

Structure 
The work has nine pieces with these single titles (originally in English):

Why
What
Where
When
Which
Who
The unaskable question
How
Why again

 There is an allusion to Charles Ives' piece, The Unanswered Question.
 The last piece, Why again is arguably a transformed reprise of the first piece, Why.

Performances 
Single pieces have been performed first. For instance, "How" was first performed on 28 March 2004 by Anastasio Raffaele and Elena di Stefani at the Auditorium Marianum in Perugia, Italy (concert of the winners of the XVI piano competition piccole mani of the Associazione Musicale Frescobaldi).

The whole cycle was first performed by Ulrike Dehning and Juan María Solare at the Community Hall (Gemeindehaus) of the church Zionskirche in Worpswede (Germany) on 10 June 2007 (cycle Orgelmusik nr. 116).

Argentine Premiere: Gonzalo Casares-Mariano De Filippis, 1 November 2008, Buenos Aires (Facultad de Derecho of the University of Buenos Aires - UBA)

Japanese Premiere: Yumiko Meguri and Yuji Takahashi, 2 November 2013 at the Salon Tessera, Sangenjaya, Tokyo, Japan.

Musical Style

As the subtitle "Satiericon" shows, this cycle of pieces is related to Dadaist composer Erik Satie.

Compositions by Juan María Solare
Compositions for piano four-hands
2002 compositions